Pei Min (fl. early 8th century)() was a Chinese military general during the Kaiyuan era. He participated in battles against the Xiongnu, the Tibetan Empire, and Khitans. He is known as the Sword Saint as he was very skilled in swordplay. He also was said to be a great archer and was said to have killed thirty one tigers in a single day. Emperor Wenzong of Tang, in an imperial decree, included Pei Min in the "Three Wonders of the Tang Dynasty," which refer to Pei Min's swordplay, Li Bai's poetry, and Zhang Xu’s calligraphy.

Accounts about Pei Min

It is said that Li Bai once wanted to learn swordplay from Pei Min. Also, he supposedly "threw the sword into the clouds, more than 109 feet (10 Zhàng) high, as lightning struck down, leading his hands he bore it with the sheath, in front of a thousand spectators, trembling and shuddering.

At one point in time, Pei Min was an envoy to the Long Hua Army and guarded Beiping (now Beijing). Pei Min was good at archery and shot thirty-one tigers in one day. An old man said to him, "These look like tigers, but yet are not. If a general met a real tiger, he would be helpless." Pei proceeded to ask "Then where is the real tiger?" The old man told him "Thirty kilometers north, there is." When Pei Min arrived there, he saw a small, but fierce, tiger. Its roared shattered rocks on the ground. His horse got away and his bow fell. From that day onwards, Pei Min did not shoot tigers again.

Poetry about Pei Min
The following is the poem "Gift to General Pei" by Yan Zhenqing:

It roughly translates to:

References

Tang dynasty generals
8th-century Chinese military personnel